Strung Out is an American punk rock band from Simi Valley, California, formed in 1989. They are known mainly for their musical style, which fuses aspects of melodic punk rock, progressive rock and heavy metal to form their primary sound. They have released nine studio albums on Fat Wreck Chords as well as one Live album, 2 B-sides collections, a best-of, a box set and appeared on numerous compilations and skate/surf/dirt bike/offroading videos. They have played on the Warped Tour and continue to tour internationally. The band currently have an ongoing collaboration beer with Lucky Luke Brewing Company called “Astrolux Golden Ale”. Their albums have charted on the Billboard 200.

History
The band formed in 1989 in Simi Valley, California. The original lineup consisted of vocalist Jason Cruz, guitarists Rob Ramos and Jake Kiley, bassist Jim Cherry and drummer Adam Austin. After releasing a self-titled 7" record, they became one of the first bands to be signed to Fat Wreck Chords, the record label owned and operated by Fat Mike of the band NOFX. Austin left the band in 1992 and was replaced by Jordan Burns, formerly of fellow Simi Valley natives Ten Foot Pole. Their first album, Another Day in Paradise, was released in May 1994. Suburban Teenage Wasteland Blues followed in 1996. In 1998 they released The Skinny Years...Before We Got Fat, a compilation album of their pre-Fat Wreck Chords material.

Bassist Jim Cherry was fired from the band in 1999 and went on to play in Pulley and Zero Down, but died of heart failure in 2002 at the age of 30. He was replaced by Chris Aiken, whose musical background had a strong impact on the 2000 eight-song EP, The Element of Sonic Defiance.

In 2002, the band released their fourth full-length album An American Paradox, their first release to appear in the Billboard 200. The initial production run contained a bonus song entitled "Don't Look Back". A video was filmed for the song "Cemetery" and was included on several punk rock video compilations. In 2003 they recorded and released a live album as part of the Fat Wreck Chords Live in a Dive series. Exile in Oblivion, was released on November 2, 2004, with a video filmed for the song "Analog." Strung Out released their sixth full-length album, Blackhawks Over Los Angeles on June 12, 2007.

In March 2009, Strung Out released a collection of rarities & B-sides entitled Prototypes and Painkillers. The album is the second such compilation from the band who previously compiled similar material on The Skinny Years: Before We Got Fat in 1998.

On September 29, 2009, Strung Out released their 7th studio album titled Agents of the Underground. This has a less political tone to it than their previous one, and it also combines more of the old fast sound with heavy metal influences.

On July 19, 2011, they released the compilation album Top Contenders: The Best of Strung Out. In contains remastered versions of 23 songs, and 3 new songs; "City Lights", "Saturday Night", and "Here We Are".

On August 2, 2012, drummer Jordan Burns revealed to Punknews.org that Strung Out planned to release a new album. Transmission.Alpha.Delta was announced as the title of the album, initially scheduled to be released in the summer of 2014. The album was delayed and released on March 24, 2015.

On April 18, 2018, the band released an eight-song EP called Black Out the Sky, which was inspired by Alice in Chains' 1994 acoustic EP Jar of Flies.

As of February 19, 2018, the band announced on their Facebook page that Jordan Burns is no longer the drummer. Soon after it was revealed that RJ Shankle of the band Runaway Kids was selected to be the new drummer of Strung Out.

On January 7, 2019 both Strung Out and Jason Cruz posted to their respective social media accounts that the band was in the studio recording a new album. Cruz later confirmed that the album was not an acoustic recording like Black Out The Sky but rather a full punk rock album. In another series of posts by Jason Cruz revealed Agents of the Underground producer Cameron Webb would be returning to produce the upcoming album.

On May 15, 2019, Jason Cruz announced the name of the upcoming Strung Out album, Songs of Armor and Devotion on Episode 15 of the Dying Scene Podcast. The album was released August 9, 2019. It embodied a return to speed, upping the tempo from the previous two albums. Regarded as one of, if not the most, technically ambitious Strung Out records to date.

In January 2023, the band officially revealed that they are in the studio working on a new album.

Band members
Current members
 Jason Cruz – lead vocals (1989–present)
 Jake Kiley – guitar, backing vocals (1989–present)
 Rob Ramos – guitar, backing vocals (1989–present)
 Chris Aiken – bass, backing vocals (1999–present)
 Daniel Blume – drums (2022–present, substitute musician 2018)

Former members
 Jim Cherry – bass, backing vocals (1989–1999; died 2002)
 Adam Austin – drums, percussion (1989–1992)
 Jordan Burns – drums, percussion (1993–2018)
 RJ Shankle – drums (2018–2022)

Timeline

Discography

Studio albums
Another Day in Paradise (1994)
Suburban Teenage Wasteland Blues (1996)
Twisted by Design (1998)
An American Paradox (2002)
Exile in Oblivion (2004)
Blackhawks Over Los Angeles (2007)
Agents of the Underground (2009)
Transmission.Alpha.Delta (2015)
Songs of Armor and Devotion (2019)

Compilation albums
The Skinny Years...Before We Got Fat (1998)
Prototypes and Painkillers (2009)
Top Contenders: The Best of Strung Out (2011)

Live albums
Live in a Dive (2003)

EPs
Crossroads & Illusions (1998)
The Element of Sonic Defiance (2000)
Black Out the Sky (2018)

References

External links
/ Official website
Truepunk interview with Strung Out (audio format only
Truepunk second interview with Strung Out
Strung Out interview May 2009 on Exclaim
Skratch Magazine: article
Concert live wire: interview
Interview at The Land Salmon
Interview with Chris Aiken
Interview With Jake Kiley

Musical groups from Ventura County, California
Fat Wreck Chords artists
Musical groups established in 1989
Melodic hardcore musical groups from California